Rhodopin (1,2-dihydro-ψ,ψ-caroten-1-ol)  is a carotenoid. It is a major carotenoid of phototropic bacteria such as Rhodomicrobium vannielii and Rhodopseudomonas acidophila strain 7050.

References

Carotenoids